Aupaluktut Island is an uninhabited Baffin Island offshore island located in the Arctic Archipelago in Nunavut's Qikiqtaaluk Region. It lies in Cumberland Sound, between Brown Inlet and Ikpit Bay. Nuvujen Island lies to its north.

References

External links 
 Aupaluktut Island in the Atlas of Canada - Toporama; Natural Resources Canada

Islands of Baffin Island
Islands of Cumberland Sound
Uninhabited islands of Qikiqtaaluk Region